Gower Cemetery is a historic African American cemetery located in Edmond, Oklahoma. It was established in 1889 by a formerly enslaved couple named Ophelia and John Gower who allowed other families of color and indigent people to bury their dead on their land for free.

History
The burial ground was recognized by the State of Oklahoma in 1907. The Gower's granddaughter worked to have the site added to the National Register of Historic Places in 1991 as the sole surviving proof of a former black homesteading community in that location. It is estimated that 200 individuals are interred at the site which is located east of Interstate 35 on Covel Road between Douglas and Post Roads.

References

External links
Gower Memorial Cemetery
Find a Grave

African-American cemeteries
National Register of Historic Places in Oklahoma County, Oklahoma